Jean Carlos Santiago Pérez (born September 16, 1992), known professionally as Guaynaa, is a Puerto Rican rapper and singer. He is known for the song "Rebota", which became his first song to reach the Billboard Hot Latin Songs chart in April 2019.

He is signed to American music label Universal Music Latino.

Biography 
Guaynaa was born in Caguas, Puerto Rico, to a Cuban mother and a Puerto Rican father. Before pursuing a musical career, he was working as a phone salesman in a mall. He was going to become a petrochemical engineer before working in music. As of March 2023 he is married to Venezuelan-American actress, singer, YouTuber, and author Lele Pons who he has been in a relationship with since December 2020.

Career 
He gained fame due to the success of his song "Rebota", which reached number 35 on the Billboard Hot Latin Songs chart in April 2019 and has received over 300 million views on YouTube. The song's remix featured Becky G, Farruko, Nicky Jam and Sech in July 2019 and was later certified 4× platinum by the RIAA's Latin division. After the success of "ReBoTa", he signed a joint record deal with Universal Music Latino and Republic Records.

In August 2019, Guaynaa appeared on a remix of PJ Sin Suela's single "La Pelua" with Jon Z and Rafa Pabón. In October 2019, he collaborated with Spanish rapper Mala Rodríguez on the single "Dame Bien". In November 2019, he made a song with Yandel, saying that "it was a dream come true". He also has collaborated with Mon Laferte and Mariah Angeliq, among others.

In February 2020, he received a Premios Heat nomination, along with Paloma Mami and Cami. In 2021, he was featured on Korean singer Chungha's debut studio album, Querencia, on the track "Demente".

Discography

Studio albums

EPs

Singles

Guest appearances

Notes

References 

1992 births
Living people
Puerto Rican rappers
People from Caguas, Puerto Rico
Universal Music Latino artists
Republic Records artists
Puerto Rican reggaeton musicians
Puerto Rican people of Cuban descent